Nicholas Stoller (born March 19, 1976) is a British-American filmmaker. He is known mainly for directing the 2008 comedy Forgetting Sarah Marshall, its 2010 spin-off/sequel, Get Him to the Greek, The Five-Year Engagement, Neighbors (2014), its 2016 sequel Neighbors 2: Sorority Rising, co-writing and executive producing The Muppets and Muppets Most Wanted, and writing and directing Storks (2016).

Early life 
Stoller was born in 1976 in London, England, and was raised in Miami, Florida, U.S., with his brother, Matt Stoller, a prominent political writer. His mother, Phyllis, is a travel tour operator, and his father, Eric C. Stoller, is a bank executive. Stoller was raised Jewish. He attended high school at St. Paul's, a New Hampshire boarding school. He went on to attend Harvard College and wrote for the comedy publication The Harvard Lampoon, and played for the improv comedy troupe The Immediate Gratification Players while an undergraduate.

Career 
From 2000 to 2001, Stoller wrote for Judd Apatow's short-lived Fox television series Undeclared and later co-wrote, again with Apatow, the 2005 comedy Fun with Dick and Jane. Stoller's directorial debut, the 2008 film Forgetting Sarah Marshall, is a romantic comedy starring Jason Segel, Mila Kunis, Jonah Hill, Kristen Bell, Bill Hader and Russell Brand. The film was produced by Apatow Productions and was released by Universal on April 18, 2008.

In 2007, he wrote a single-camera comedy about a new teacher taking a job at the boarding school he once attended. He wrote Yes Man, starring Jim Carrey; the film was produced by Richard Zanuck and David Heyman. Stoller next wrote and directed a new film for Universal and Apatow Productions titled Get Him to the Greek. The film reteamed Stoller and Apatow with Forgetting Sarah Marshall co-stars Jonah Hill and Russell Brand. The film premiered on May 25, 2010, and opened in theaters on June 4, 2010.

In 2008, Stoller and Segel co-wrote The Muppets, the latest film incarnation to feature the characters in nearly 12 years. The film was produced by Walt Disney Pictures and released on November 23, 2011. After the film's success, Stoller and the film's director, James Bobin, wrote Muppets Most Wanted, a semi-sequel to the film.

Stoller also directed The Five-Year Engagement (2012), which he co-wrote with Jason Segel, who also starred. Apatow Productions produced the picture, which is about the ups and downs of a couple's five-year engagement. Stoller directed the film Neighbors, its sequel Neighbors 2: Sorority Rising and shared a screenwriting credit on Sex Tape. In 2016, Stoller wrote and directed the animated comedy film Storks for Warner Animation Group. The film was released on September 23, 2016.

Along with his wife Francesca Delbanco, Stoller created the comedy television series Friends from College, which premiered on Netflix in July 2017. Stoller directed all eight episodes of the first season.

More recently, his Stoller Global Solutions company has renewed an overall deal with Sony Pictures Television.

Personal life 
Stoller met Francesca Delbanco (daughter of writer Nicholas Delbanco and granddaughter of cellist Bernard Greenhouse) at a playwriting workshop for Harvard graduates in 2001. They married in a Jewish ceremony in September 2005. They have two daughters.

Filmography

Films

Television 

Appeared as himself

Other works

References

External links 

1976 births
20th-century American screenwriters
20th-century British screenwriters
21st-century American screenwriters
21st-century British screenwriters
American male screenwriters
American male television writers
American people of English-Jewish descent
American television directors
American television writers
British Jews
Comedy film directors
Film directors from Florida
Film directors from London
Film producers from Florida
Harvard College alumni
Living people
Screenwriters from Florida
St. Paul's School (New Hampshire) alumni
The Harvard Lampoon alumni
Writers from London
Writers from Miami